The 2017 V de V Challenge Monoplace was a multi-event motor racing championship for open wheel, formula racing cars held across Europe. The championship features drivers competing mainly in 2 litre Formula Renault single seat race cars that conform to the technical regulations for the championship. The season began at Circuit de Barcelona-Catalunya on 17 March and will finish on 5 November at Estoril after seven triple-header rounds.

Drivers compete in two classes depending on the type of car they drive. Those competing in the current Tatuus FR 2.0 2013 car, as well as the previous Barazi-Epsilon FR2.0–10 car, which are in use since 2010, are included in Class A. Old Formula Renault 2.0 machinery along with other cars such as Formula BMW and Formula Abarth encompass Class B.

Teams and drivers

Race calendar and results

Standings

Points system

Points are awarded following a complex system. Drivers receive a set of points according to their overall position in each race, as well as an additional set of points according to their position within the class their car belongs to. No separated standings for classes A and B are issued. The points distribution is as follows:

The total number of points scored in each round is multiplied by a coefficient, depending on the round. Only the best 19 results are counted towards the overall standings, whereas all results are valid towards the Gentlemen Drivers standings.

Drivers' standings

References

External links

V de V Challenge Monoplace
V de V Challenge Monoplace
V de V Challenge Monoplace